Youngblood (released in the Philippines as Fight for Love) is a 1986 American sports drama film directed, co-produced, and co-written by Peter Markle, and starring Rob Lowe, Cynthia Gibb and Patrick Swayze. The film's cast also includes Keanu Reeves in his first feature film role.

Plot
Dean Youngblood, a 17-year-old farmhand from rural New York, has dreams of playing in the National Hockey League. Dean voices these dreams to his father who disapproves; however, Dean's brother, Kelly, convinces their father to relent. Dean travels to Canada to try out for the Hamilton Mustangs where he demonstrates his offensive skills but displays a lack of physical toughness.

Dean earns the nickname "Pretty Boy" brought on by his rivalry with fellow hockey player Carl Racki. Racki, who is competing for a spot, engages him in a fight and quickly defeats him. Despite this, the Mustangs head coach, a former NHL All-Star, selects Dean for the team. Dean also begins a flirtation with the coach's daughter, Jessie.

After his team mentor, Derek Sutton, is deliberately injured by Racki (now with a rival team), Dean returns home. His brother inspires him to keep playing, and his brother teaches him some fighting skills off of the ice, his father teaches him on the ice. Dean returns to the team, ready to confront Racki in the final game of the Memorial Cup playoffs.

The game ends with a winning penalty shot goal by Dean with 3 seconds left. As time expires, he confronts and defeats Racki in a fight and is carried off the ice on the shoulders of his teammates.

Cast 

 Rob Lowe as Dean "Pretty Boy" Youngblood
 Charlie Wasley as young Dean Youngblood
 Ed Lauter as Murray Chadwick
 Cynthia Gibb as Jessie Chadwick
 Jim Youngs as Kelly Youngblood
 Ricky Davis as young Kelly Youngblood
 Patrick Swayze as Derek Sutton
 Fionnula Flanagan as Miss McGill
 Ken James as Frazier
 George J. Finn as Carl Racki
 Peter Faussett as Huey
 Eric Nesterenko as Blane Youngblood
 Keanu Reeves as Heaver

Cameos 
 Peter Zezel as Rossini, Mustang Player #1.
 Steve Thomas as Jordie, Mustang Player #4.

Production
The filming of Youngblood took place in the east end of Toronto in the summer of 1984. Ted Reeve Arena was used as the setting for the interior of the Hamilton Mustangs home rink while Scarborough Arena Gardens was used for the setting of the arena's exterior. St Michaels College School arena was used as well. While there was a Memorial Cup eligible Ontario Hockey League (OHL) team located in Hamilton in 1986, they were called the Hamilton Steelhawks, as compared to the film's fictional Hamilton Mustangs.

Several of the cast and crew had actual hockey experience and skills, though star Rob Lowe had to learn to skate, and both he and Patrick Swayze, a better skater, used doubles for many of their on-ice skating scenes. Director and writer Peter Markle was a former minor-pro and international player for the USA. Cinematographer Mark Irwin, a Canadian, wore skates and a helmet and devised a special rig for shooting hockey scenes on the ice. The film's hockey consultant, Eric Nesterenko, a 20 year National Hockey League veteran and Stanley Cup Champion, in addition to playing the father of Lowe's character. Keanu Reeves, who played the Mustangs goalie, had played goalie at a Toronto high school, earning the nickname "The Wall". George Finn, who played villain Carl Racki, was a former major junior player, and enforcer, in the OHL. Many of the other uncredited team members were actual major junior or NCAA hockey players, as well as two active NHL players, Steve Thomas and Peter Zezel.

Lowe later said he "hated" learning how to skate. "I don't like any sport where you're already exhausted when you're done putting on the equipment. But that said, once I got the equipment on and was out on the ice, I loved that. I loved hitting people, being hit, skating. I love the exertion and competition, so that was all great. But it's a lot of work putting all of that shit on! Give me a surfboard and let me just paddle into the ocean."

Release
Youngblood was released in the United States on January 30, 1986. In the Philippines, the film was released as Fight for Love six years later, on July 15, 1992.

Critical response
The film gained a mediocre reception, with critics finding the plot derivative. 
It became a popular VHS video rental and cable TV showing.

See also
 List of American films of 1986

References

External links

 
 

1986 films
1986 romantic drama films
1980s sports drama films
1980s teen drama films
1980s teen romance films
American ice hockey films
American romantic drama films
American sports drama films
American teen drama films
American teen romance films
1980s English-language films
Films directed by Peter Markle
Films set in Ontario
Films shot in Hamilton, Ontario
Films shot in Minnesota
Films shot in Toronto
Metro-Goldwyn-Mayer films
United Artists films
1980s American films